Suhr railway station is a railway station in the municipality of Suhr, in the Swiss canton of Aargau. It is located at the intersection of the standard gauge Zofingen–Wettingen line of Swiss Federal Railways (SBB) and the  gauge Schöftland–Aarau–Menziken line of Aargau Verkehr.

History
Suhr station was constructed by the Swiss National Railway (Schweizerische Nationalbahn; SNB). It was originally situated just to the west of the junction of the SNB's standard gauge Zofingen–Wettingen and Aarau–Suhr lines, opening with those lines in 1877. The station and former SNB lines became part of the Swiss Northeastern Railway (Schweizerische Nordostbahn; NOB) in 1878, and of the SBB in 1902. In 1904, the Wynental Railway (WTB) opened a metre gauge street tramway from Aarau to Menziken through Suhr, crossing the standard gauge line by a level crossing to the west of the station. In 1958 the WTB became part of the Wynental- und Suhrentalbahn (WSB) company.

In 2004, the SBB closed the stamdard gauge Aarau–Suhr line in order to permit the re-routing of the roughly parallel metre gauge line off surface streets. As part of this re-routing, a new underpass was constructed to take the narrow gauge line under the SBB's Zofingen to Wettingen line to the east of Suhr station, and new platforms built at the station providing direct interchange between the standard and metre gauge lines. The new route opened in 2010. In 2018, the WSB became part of the Aargau Verkehr AG (AVA) company.

Services
The following services stop at Suhr:

 Aargau S-Bahn:

References

Bibliography

External links 
 
 

Railway stations in the canton of Aargau
Swiss Federal Railways stations